Sasbachwalden is a Black Forest municipality in Western Baden-Württemberg, Germany, popular with tourists. It is located on the western slopes of mountain Hornisgrinde in the Northern Black Forest and belongs to the district of Ortenau. More than 70% of the town area are forest.

History

Sasbachwalden was first mentioned in 1347 as a group of individual farms and houses. Only in 1817 Sasbachwalden became an independent community. Since 1973 the town belongs to district of Ortenau.

Education

The town has a centrally located kindergarten and elementary school. Institutions for higher education are in the nearby towns Achern and Sasbach.

Economy

Main sources of income are tourism, winegrowing, the production of Black Forest kirsch and most importantly wood processing.

See also
 Alde Gott

References

Ortenaukreis